Pokaia (died 1807) was a Ngāpuhi chief from Northland, New Zealand. He was killed at the battle of Moremonui in an ambush by the Ngāti Whātua. His sister Te Kona was the mother of Hōne Heke.

References

Ngāpuhi people
1807 deaths
Year of birth unknown